Nkosana Mpofu (born 10 July 1990) is a Zimbabwean first-class cricketer who plays for Matabeleland Tuskers. Outside of Zimbabwe, he has also played cricket for Strabane Cricket Club in Ireland. In December 2020, he was selected to play for the Tuskers in the 2020–21 Logan Cup.

References

External links
 

1990 births
Living people
Zimbabwean cricketers
Matabeleland Tuskers cricketers
Sportspeople from Bulawayo